Samuel Edward Grant (born 30 August 1995) is an English former first-class cricketer.

Grant was born at Shoreham-by-Sea in August 1995. He was educated at Brighton College, before going up to Loughborough University. While studying at Loughborough, he made four appearances in first-class cricket for Loughborough MCCU from 2014 to 2016. He scored 66 runs in his four matches at an average of 33.00, with a high score of 50 against Kent in 2016. An expensive left-arm medium-fast bowler, Grant has a first-class economy rate of 5.13 from 78 overs bowled, in which he took a single wicket while conceding a total of 401 runs.

References

External links

1995 births
Living people
People from Shoreham-by-Sea
People educated at Brighton College
Alumni of Loughborough University
English cricketers
Loughborough MCCU cricketers